Black Rhythm Revolution! is the first album by the jazz drummer Idris Muhammad. It was recorded for the Prestige label in 1970.

Reception

Stewart Mason of AllMusic wrote: "Black Rhythm Revolution is not a bad album at all; in fact, most of the tracks are good to great, with the lengthy bookends "By the Red Sea" and "Wander" both featuring memorable grooves and tight, compact solos. It's just considerably less intense than the title might lead one to believe." Most critics who listened to the album said, although largely unknown, it was one of the better drummer albums of its time.

Track listing
All compositions by Idris Muhammad except where noted.
 "Express Yourself" (Charles Wright) – 5:28  
 "Soulful Drums" (Jack McDuff) – 4:42  
 "Super Bad" (James Brown) – 5:31  
 "Wander" – 11:11  
 "By the Red Sea" – 8:56

Personnel
Idris Muhammad – drums
Virgil Jones – trumpet
Clarence Thomas – tenor saxophone, soprano saxophone
Harold Mabern – electric piano
Melvin Sparks – guitar
Jimmy Lewis – electric bass
Buddy Caldwell – congas

Production
 Bob Porter – producer
 Rudy Van Gelder – engineer

References

Idris Muhammad albums
1971 debut albums
Prestige Records albums
Albums produced by Bob Porter (record producer)
Albums recorded at Van Gelder Studio